Pacific Southwest Airlines (PSA) was a regional U.S. airline headquartered in San Diego, California, that operated from 1949 to 1998. It was the first large discount airline in the United States. PSA called itself "The World's Friendliest Airline" and painted a smile on the nose of its airplanes, the PSA Grinningbirds. Opinion L.A. of the Los Angeles Times called PSA  "practically the unofficial flag carrier airline of California for almost forty years."

The airline initially operated as an intrastate airline wholly within the state of California.  This strategy which avoided the steep costs from federal regulation would later serve as the model for Southwest Airlines, doing in Texas what PSA had done in California. After the Airline Deregulation Act of 1978, PSA expanded to cities in other western states, and eventually to several cities in Mexico.

PSA was purchased by USAir (later renamed US Airways) in 1986 and was fully merged into the airline on April 9, 1988. The PSA acquisition gave USAir a network on the West Coast, and at about the same time, USAir also purchased Piedmont Airlines which gave the carrier a network on the East Coast. The combined airline became one of the world's largest. US Airways was acquired by America West Airlines in 2005 in a reverse merger, and the combined airline purchased American Airlines in 2015.

American Airlines Group continues to use the PSA name and trademark for its regional airline subsidiary, PSA Airlines which operates flights on behalf of American Eagle. American Airlines also operates an Airbus A319 painted in the PSA Grinningbird scheme, to pay tribute to the airline.

History

Kenny Friedkin founded the airline in 1949 with a $1,000-a-month leased Douglas DC-3. Friedkin obtained information from a travel agent upon starting the airline due to lessons learned from a failed precursor airline (Friedkin Airlines). The DC-3 began a weekly round trip from San Diego to Oakland via Burbank. Reservations were initially taken at a World War II surplus latrine refitted as a ticket office. In 1951 PSA moved its flights from Oakland to San Francisco International Airport; in late 1955 PSA replaced the DC-3s with two Douglas DC-4s from Capital Airlines, painting rectangles around the windows to make them resemble the Douglas DC-6.

In January 1958 PSA scheduled 37 DC-4s a week Burbank to San Francisco (29 of which originated in San Diego) and four nonstops San Diego to San Francisco; fare from Burbank to San Francisco was $9.99. United Airlines, Western Airlines and TWA then scheduled a total of 241 nonstop flights each week from Los Angeles to San Francisco, plus 49 flights a week from Burbank to San Francisco. About half of these flights by the competition were First Class only ($22.05); the rest carried coach passengers for $13.50 (all fares were subject to 10% federal tax.) Later in 1958 PSA shifted some flights from Burbank to Los Angeles International Airport (LAX); that year it carried 296,000 passengers.

In late 1959 PSA began flying Lockheed L-188 Electras with 92 seats and a six-seat lounge, replacing the 70-seat DC-4s. In 1963 it got its sixth Electra; by then it carried more passengers between the Bay Area and Los Angeles than any other airline. Total PSA passengers climbed from 355,000 in 1959 to 1,305,000 in 1963 and 5,162,000 in 1970.

Boeing 727-114s, Boeing 727-214s, Boeing 737-214s and McDonnell Douglas DC-9-30s replaced the Electras in 1965–70. The May 1965 OAG shows 103 Electras a week Los Angeles (LAX) to San Francisco (SFO), 32 a week Los Angeles to Oakland, 34 a week Burbank to San Francisco and 5 a week San Diego to San Francisco. Schedule time Los Angeles to San Francisco was 60 minutes while Burbank-San Francisco was 55 minutes. (Apparently, the May OAG wasn't up to date; PSA's timetable for 20 April 1965 shows some 727 flights. On Fridays and Sundays the 727 left San Diego in the morning and returned 16 hours later after making seven LAX-SFO-LAX round trips; other days of the week it made six round trips.)

In 1966 PSA started flying to San Jose, and in 1967 to Sacramento Executive Airport (SAC); later that year PSA and other airlines moved to the new Sacramento International Airport (SMF). Ontario was added in 1968 and Long Beach, Fresno and Stockton in 1971–72. In 1967 PSA was finally allowed to use offshore airway V25 to San Diego, despite being an intrastate airline.

In 1974-75 PSA flew two wide-body Lockheed L-1011 TriStars, which were unique in having lower deck seating; they flew Los Angeles-San Francisco and San Diego-Los Angeles-San Francisco.  PSA was the only intrastate airline in the U.S. ever to operate wide-body jets. Electras returned in 1975 for flights to Lake Tahoe that ended in 1979 (the Lake Tahoe Airport, in the Sierra Nevada, did not allow scheduled airline jets until the 1980s although Pacific Air Lines briefly flew Boeing 727-100s to Lake Tahoe in 1966.)  Major intrastate competitor Air California also flew Electras to Lake Tahoe until 1979–80 but then returned to Lake Tahoe as AirCal with McDonnell Douglas MD-80s and Boeing 737-300s after the jet ban ended.  PSA never served Lake Tahoe after retiring its Electras.

After airline deregulation PSA expanded beyond California to Reno, Las Vegas, Salt Lake City, Phoenix, Tucson and Albuquerque. Its first flight beyond California was Oakland to Reno in December 1978. The airline introduced automated ticketing and check-in machines at several airports and briefly flew to Cabo San Lucas in Mexico. When PSA's plan to buy the assets of Braniff International Airways fell through, the airline expanded its network north to Washington, Oregon and Idaho. PSA operated new BAe 146-200s to smaller airports like Eureka, California and Concord, California. PSA held a "Name the Plane" contest, publicized in full-page newspaper advertisements, to name the fleet, with the prize being a private flight for the winner and  The winning entry was Smiliner, submitted by Dr. Hugh Jordan of Whittier, California.

In 1987 Western and AirCal were purchased (by Delta Air Lines and American Airlines respectively). An hour after the AirCal deal was announced PSA agreed to merge with USAir, which was completed in 1997. PSA was then in talks with Boeing about acquiring a 757-200. PSA's last flight was on April 8, 1988. The PSA route network slowly disintegrated within USAir and was gone by 2004. Most of the former airline's assets were scrapped or moved to USAir's hubs on the East Coast. PSA's base at San Diego International Airport was gutted and served for a time as that airport's commuter terminal, before being renovated in administrative offices. PSA had planned to become a nationwide carrier; by the time of the merger, PSA routes reached as far east as Colorado and New Mexico and as far north as Washington.

In the San Diego Air & Space Museum a display showcases PSA, the city's home town airline.

PSA was one of the sponsors of The Dating Game TV show on ABC from 1965 to 1973.

After the 2005 merger of US Airways and America West, a US Airways Airbus A319 was repainted in PSA's livery as one of four heritage aircraft commemorating the airlines that had merged to form the present-day US Airways. The aircraft was dedicated at San Diego International Airport's former commuter terminal (PSA's former operations base) on March 30, 2006. The plane has since been repainted with the American Airlines logo.

Corporate culture
PSA was known for its sense of humor. Founder Ken Friedkin wore Hawaiian shirts and encouraged his pilots and stewardesses to joke with passengers. Its slogan was "The World's Friendliest Airline", and its recognizable trademark was a smile painted on the nose of each plane and an accompanying advertising campaign declaring "Catch Our Smile". Because of the major San Diego flight schedule and its discount fares, military personnel nicknamed PSA the "Poor Sailor's Airline." After PSA was bought by USAir, ex-PSA mechanics would occasionally paint smiles on USAir planes as a joke.

In the 1960s PSA was known for the brightly colored flight attendant uniforms, with miniskirts; in the early 1970s the fashion changed to hotpants. One PSA flight attendant, Marilyn Tritt, wrote a book about her tenure at the company titled Long Legs and Short Nights.

Management diversified in the early 1970s into a broadcasting venture called PSA Broadcasting. Radio stations were purchased in Sacramento (96.9 KPSC later KEZC), San Jose (106.5 KEZD later KEZR), Los Angeles (107.5 KPSA later KLVE) and San Diego (102.9 KEZL now KLQV). All ran easy listening formats (hence EZ call letter combinations). The idea was to keep some of the airline's advertising dollars within the broadcasting company as well as collect some co-op (co-operative advertising) from businesses doing business with the airline. These stations were sold in the late 1970s. 

Throughout PSA's lifetime, the flight attendants, with their humor, over-the-top passenger service, and sense of duty, helped to create a loyal passenger following. One flight attendant, Sandy Daniels, with the help of a frequent flyer, started the "Precious Stewardess Association". Frequent fliers would bring tasty treats to the crew, particularly on morning flights. In turn, PSA started the "Precious Passenger Association", with certificates and free drinks given to friendly and helpful passengers.

Ken Friedkin's son Tom was a PSA pilot in 1962 when the elder Friedkin died abruptly of a stroke, aged 47. A year later, Tom Friedkin's mother died, making him the largest shareholder of PSA. Tom had a seat on the Board of Directors but continued as a full-time pilot for the airline.

Southwest Airlines founder Herb Kelleher studied PSA extensively and used many of the airline's ideas to form the corporate culture at Southwest, and even on early flights used the same "Long Legs And Short Nights" theme for stewardesses on Southwest flights.

PSA helped train the first class of mechanics for Southwest Airlines and lent the fledgling carrier flight manuals and other needed items.

Headquarters
PSA headquarters were a windowless gray-brown building on Harbor Drive in San Diego, California. The building was San Diego International Airport's commuter terminal until 2015 when it was converted into administrative offices of the San Diego County Regional Airport Authority.

Accidents and incidents
On January 15, 1969, a PSA Boeing 727-100, N973PS, collided with Cessna 182 N42242 while it was climbing to its cruising altitude. Both aircraft were in controlled airspace on the same frequency. The 727 continued on to Ontario, CA and made a safe landing. The right wing of the Cessna was damaged, so it returned to San Francisco. This incident was similar to the San Diego crash of Flight 182 nine years later.
On March 5, 1974, a PSA NAMC YS-11 training aircraft's engines failed, resulting in the aircraft crashing in the desert near Borrego Springs, California. The turboprop aircraft was doing a simulated landing stall. All of the four crew members survived the crash. The aircraft was written off.
On September 25, 1978, PSA Flight 182, a Boeing 727-200, crashed in San Diego while trying to land at Lindbergh Field (San Diego International Airport), California, after colliding with a Cessna 172 operated by Gibbs Flite Center. The 727 crashed at the intersection of Dwight and Nile. The Cessna fell a few blocks away. All 135 aboard the PSA flight were killed, as were the 2 in the Cessna and 7 on the ground. At the time, it was the deadliest plane crash in U.S. history; it remains the worst mid-air collision in the United States. A lawsuit argued by Gary Aguirre resulted in a verdict against PSA for damages. Graphic footage of the aftermath including destroyed houses, the wreckage itself and horrifically mutilated body parts of victims were shown in the mondo film Faces of Death, released just 2 weeks later.
On December 7, 1987, PSA Flight 1771, a BAe 146, bound for San Francisco International Airport from Los Angeles International Airport, was airborne above the central coast of California when it suddenly entered a high-speed nosedive and crashed on a cattle ranch near the small coastal town of Cayucos in San Luis Obispo County. Investigations determined that David Burke, a former employee of USAir (which had recently acquired PSA) who had been fired for theft, had armed himself and boarded the flight, which was carrying his former manager. After writing a note on an air sickness bag, Burke then shot his ex-manager, a flight attendant, both pilots and the airline's chief pilot. After shooting the pilots, Burke pushed down on the control column, causing it to enter a dive. There were no survivors among the 43 aboard (38 passengers, 5 crew).

Hijackings
There were several attempted hijackings which resulted in no injuries and the surrender of the often lone hijacker.  These incidents are not included. The following are notable hijackings because of fatalities or success in forcing the aircraft to fly to another country
On January 7, 1972, PSA 902, a Boeing 727-200 flight from San Francisco to Los Angeles was hijacked to Cuba. The captain negotiated the release of the passengers in Los Angeles and the hijackers, armed with a shotgun and other arms, were taken to Cuba, with a fueling stop in Tampa where they released custody of the aircraft back to the captain. Three flight attendants and three off-duty flight attendants were not released with the passengers and accompanied the flight to Cuba.
On July 5, 1972, PSA Flight 710, a Boeing 737-200 flight from Sacramento to San Francisco was hijacked with demands to fly to the Soviet Union. The plane was stormed while on the ground at San Francisco, resulting in the deaths of one passenger and the two hijackers. One of the passengers, who survived being shot in the back, was the actor Victor Sen Yung, best known as Hop Sing from the Bonanza television series. One other passenger was shot and survived.
On May 1, 1980, PSA Flight 818, a Boeing 727 flying from Stockton to Los Angeles was hijacked prior to passenger boarding. The hijacker demanded to be taken to Iran, but was overpowered several hours later by sole hostage Alan Romatowski, the flight engineer left on board the aircraft.

Destinations

PSA served the following domestic destinations in the U.S. at various times during its existence.

Arizona
 Phoenix Sky Harbor International Airport, Phoenix (PHX)
 Tucson International Airport, Tucson (TUS)

California
 Arcata-Eureka Airport, Arcata/Eureka (ACV)
 Burbank-Glendale-Pasadena Airport, Burbank (BUR)
 Buchanan Field Airport, Concord (CCR)
 Fresno Yosemite International Airport, Fresno (FAT)
 Lake Tahoe Airport, South Lake Tahoe (TVL)
 Long Beach Airport, Long Beach (LGB)
 Los Angeles International Airport, Los Angeles (LAX)
 Monterey Peninsula Airport, Monterey (MRY)
 Oakland International Airport, Oakland (OAK)
 Ontario International Airport, Ontario (ONT)
 Palm Springs International Airport, Palm Springs (PSP)
 Sacramento Municipal Airport (SAC) – (all airlines serving Sacramento then moved to the then-new SMF in October 1967 and SAC was renamed Sacramento Executive Airport)
 Sacramento Metropolitan Airport, Sacramento (SMF)
 San Diego International Airport, San Diego (SAN) – home base 
 San Francisco International Airport, San Francisco (SFO)
 San Jose International Airport, San Jose  (SJC)
 John Wayne Airport, Santa Ana (SNA)
 Stockton Metropolitan Airport, Stockton (SCK)

Colorado
 Yampa Valley Airport, Steamboat Springs (HDN)

Idaho
 Boise Air Terminal, Boise (BOI)

Hawaii
 Honolulu International Airport, Honolulu, Hawaii (HNL)

New Mexico
 Albuquerque International Sunport, Albuquerque (ABQ)

Nevada
 McCarran International Airport, Las Vegas (LAS)
 Reno-Tahoe International Airport, Reno (RNO)

Oregon
 Eugene Airport-Mahlon Sweet Field, Eugene (EUG) 
 Medford-Jackson County Airport, Medford (MFR) 
 Portland International Airport, Portland (PDX)
 Redmond-Roberts Field, Redmond (RDM)

Texas
 Dallas, Texas - Love Field (DAL)
 San Antonio, Texas - San Antonio International Airport (SAT)

Utah
 Salt Lake City International Airport, Salt Lake City (SLC)

Washington
 Bellingham International Airport, Bellingham (BLI)
 Pasco-Tri Cities Airport, Pasco (PSC)
 Seattle-Tacoma International Airport, Seattle (SEA)
 Spokane International Airport, Spokane (GEG)
 Yakima Air Terminal, Yakima (YKM)

Mexico

PSA also served the following destinations in Mexico at various times during its existence:

 Los Cabos (Cabo San Lucas) (SJD) 
 Mazatlan (MZT)
 Puerto Vallarta (PVR)

Fleet

Final fleet
The PSA fleet at the time of its merger into USAir:

Historic fleet

The PSA fleet formerly consisted of the aircraft:

PSA training fleet
The following aircraft were used for training only:

Detailed fleet notes

References

External links

 The PSA History Museum – Dedicated to preserving the history of PSA
 PSA-history.org – history of PSA
 Poor sailors' airline: A history of Pacific Southwest Airlines

 
Airlines established in 1949
Airlines disestablished in 1988
Companies based in San Diego
Defunct companies based in California
Defunct airlines of the United States
US Airways Group
1949 establishments in California
American companies established in 1949